A coalition of the Conservative and Liberal Unionist parties took power in the United Kingdom shortly before the 1895 general election. Conservative leader Lord Salisbury was appointed Prime Minister and his nephew, Arthur Balfour, became Leader of the House of Commons, but various major posts went to the Liberal Unionists, most notably the Leader of the House of Lords, the Liberal Unionist Duke of Devonshire, who was made Lord President, and his colleague in the Commons, Joseph Chamberlain, who became Colonial Secretary. It was this government which would conduct the Second Boer War from 1899–1902, which helped them to win a landslide victory at the 1900 general election.

The government consisted of three ministries, the first two led by Salisbury (from 1895–1902) and the third by Balfour (from 1902 onwards).


The office of Prime Minister 
Lord Salisbury was the second and last person to be head of government while not simultaneously holding the title of First Lord of the Treasury. It was said that there were some attempts to distinguish between the two offices, but in the century or more since, they have remained one and the same.

Trade reform
Balfour succeeded Salisbury as Prime Minister in 1902. Eventually, the Unionist government would falter after Chamberlain proposed his scheme for tariff reform, whose partial embrace by Balfour led to the resignation of the more orthodox free traders in the Cabinet.

Chinese miners in South Africa

After the conclusion of the Boer War, the British Government sought to rebuild the South African economy which had been devastated by the war. An important part of the rebuilding effort was to get the gold mines of the Witwatersrand, the richest in history and a major cause of the war, back in production as soon as possible. Because the government decreed that White labour was too expensive and Black labourers were reluctant to return to the mines, the government decided to import over 60,000 contracted workers from China.

This was deeply unpopular at the time, as popular opinion in much of the Western world, including Britain; was hostile to Chinese immigration. It also happened at a time when poverty and unemployment amongst working-class British people was at very high levels. On 26 March 1904, a demonstration against Chinese immigration to South Africa was held in Hyde Park and was attended by 80,000 people. The Parliamentary Committee of the Trade Union Congress then passed a resolution declaring that:

Fall from power
With his majority greatly reduced and defeat in the next election seeming inevitable, Balfour resigned as Prime Minister in December 1905, leading to the appointment of a minority Liberal government under Sir Henry Campbell-Bannerman.  In the general election which followed in 1906, all but three members of Balfour's Cabinet lost their seats, including Balfour himself.

Cabinets

Salisbury ministry

June 1895 to November 1900

November 1900 to July 1902
In November 1900, the Cabinet was reformed for the first time.

Balfour ministry

:

Changes
May 1903Lord Onslow succeeds Robert William Hanbury at the Board of Agriculture.
September to October 1903
Lord Londonderry succeeds the Duke of Devonshire as Lord President. Londonderry remains President of the Board of Education.
Lord Lansdowne succeeds Devonshire as Leader of the House of Lords. Lansdowne remains Foreign Secretary.
Lord Salisbury succeeds Arthur Balfour as Lord Privy Seal.
Austen Chamberlain succeeds Charles Ritchie at the Exchequer. Chamberlain's successor as Postmaster General is not in the Cabinet.
Alfred Lyttelton succeeds Joseph Chamberlain as Colonial Secretary.
St John Brodrick succeeds Lord George Hamilton as Secretary for India.
H. O. Arnold-Forster succeeds Brodrick as Secretary for War.
Andrew Graham-Murray succeeds Lord Balfour of Burleigh as Secretary for Scotland.
March 1905
Walter Hume Long succeeds George Wyndham as Irish Secretary.
Gerald Balfour succeeds Long at the Local Government Board.
Lord Salisbury succeeds Balfour at the Board of Trade. Salisbury remains Lord Privy Seal.
Lord Cawdor succeeds Lord Selborne at the Admiralty.
Ailwyn Fellowes succeeds Lord Onslow at the Board of Agriculture.

List of ministers

Notes

References

Sources 

 
 
 
 
 

1895-1905
Government
Government
1890s in the United Kingdom
1900s in the United Kingdom
1895 establishments in the United Kingdom
1905 disestablishments in the United Kingdom
Coalition governments of the United Kingdom
Ministries of Queen Victoria
Ministries of Edward VII
Cabinets established in 1895
Cabinets disestablished in 1905
1905 in British politics